Alto Douro may refer to:
 Alto Douro, São Tomé and Príncipe
 Alto Douro Wine Company
 Alto Douro (region), region in Portugal
 Douro DOC, a Portuguese wine region

See also
 Douro (disambiguation)